Education has always been a priority in the Salt Lake City, Utah. In 1847 pioneer Jane Dillworth held the first classes in her tent for the children of the first Mormon families. By 1850 many schools had already sprung up around the valley, and there were plans for a school attached to every wardhouse. In 1851 the territorial legislature passed the first public school law creating the office of the superintendent of schools. Many large Mormon families, such as Brigham Young's, had their own schools, known as "family schools".

In the last part of the 19th century, there was much controversy over how children in the area should be educated. Mormon influence in public schools created problems with non-Mormon parents, and raised issues about public school supervision. Mormons became upset about the number of private Protestant schools popping up. The schools would offer free tuition to Mormon students in order to convert them. Westminster College, although now a secular four-year college, is the last remaining example of these schools. LDS Church members also resented non-Mormon influences in the public schools and began to focus once again on efforts to develop church-run schools.

Many Mormon youths in grades 9–12 attend some form of religious instruction, referred to as seminary. In years past students would attend during school hours and even receive credit for it. Although many still attend during school hours, they no longer receive any credit.

Due to high birth rates and large classrooms Utah spends less per capita on students than any other state. Money is always a challenge and many businesses donate to support schools. Several districts have set up foundations to raise money.

Further reading

See also

Education in Salt Lake County
Salt Lake City School District
University of Utah

 
Education in Utah